The 1938 Irish Greyhound Derby took place during July and August with the final being held at Harold's Cross Stadium in Dublin on August 8.

The winner Abbeylara was owned by Tom Black.

Final result 
At Harold's Cross, 8 August (over 525 yards):

Distances 
8, ½

Competition Report
In the first round the St Leger and Easter Cup champion Abbeylara justified his ante-post favourite tag by winning easily but then lost in round two beaten by The Grove trained by Mick Horan. In the semi-finals Abbeylara got back to winning ways beating Manozzi in 30.33. Brave Leader won heat two from Lemon Picker and the third and final semi went to Bread Sweeper beat Dark Wife but the latter was disqualified for fighting and his place was taken by the third-place finisher Clountabonive Queen.

In the final Abbeylara controlled the race leading all the way and stretching his lead to win by eight lengths.

See also
 1938 UK & Ireland Greyhound Racing Year

References

Greyhound Derby
Irish Greyhound Derby